Abdazdi (also Romanized as Ābdazdī; also known as Āb Dazī) is a village in Bandan Rural District, in the Central District of Nehbandan County, South Khorasan Province, Iran. At the 2006 census, its population was 52, in 10 families.

References 

Populated places in Nehbandan County